Oberea tricolor is a species of beetle in the family Cerambycidae. It was described by Per Olof Christopher Aurivillius in 1924.

References

Beetles described in 1924
tricolor